The 2022 season was the San Francisco 49ers' 73rd in the National Football League (NFL), their 77th overall, and their sixth under sixth-year head coach/general manager tandem of Kyle Shanahan and John Lynch.

After having an underwhelming start, with notable season-ending injuries, combined with a 3–4 start before the bye week, the 49ers went on a 10-game winning streak, improving on their 10–7 record from the previous year after a Week 16 win over the Washington Commanders. With a Week 15 win against the Seattle Seahawks, and with the Rams and Cardinals both being mathematically eliminated from playoff contention, they won the NFC West for the first time since 2019 and clinched a playoff berth, also becoming the NFL's first team this season to win their division. The 49ers swept the NFC West for the first time since 1997, which included sweeping the Seahawks for the first time since 2011. With a 41–23 victory over the Seahawks in the Wild Card round, San Francisco completed a 3–0 sweep of all three games played against Seattle. The next week, the 49ers defeated the Dallas Cowboys 19–12 in the Divisional round, defeating them in the playoffs for the second-consecutive season. However, the 49ers lost to the Philadelphia Eagles 31–7 in the NFC Championship in which injuries to third-stringer Brock Purdy and fourth-stringer Josh Johnson during the game and first-stringer Trey Lance and second-stringer Jimmy Garoppolo previously in the season made the 49ers unable to stay competitive. 

The season was highlighted by the emergence of rookie quarterback Brock Purdy, taken last in the 2022 NFL Draft, who started after an injury to Jimmy Garoppolo (who himself replaced the injured Trey Lance) and went 5–0 as the starter to end the regular season before winning his first two playoff games. The 49ers were well-balanced and dominant on both sides of the ball during the season. On offense, they finished 5th in total offense with 365 yards per game and 6th in scoring, averaging 26.5 points a game, while also finishing first in the league in plus/minus differential with a +173. On defense, they were even more dominant, as they finished first in the league in both total defense and defensive scoring (306 yards per game and 16.3 points per game respectively). They also finished first in the league in turnover differential with a +13, which included 20 interceptions and 10 fumble recoveries.

Offseason

Roster changes

Free agency
The 49ers entered free agency with the following:

Signings

Departures

Draft

Draft trades

Staff

Final roster

Team captains
Nick Bosa (DE)
Arik Armstead (DT)
Fred Warner (MLB)
Jimmie Ward (DB)
George Kittle (TE)
Trent Williams (T)

Preseason
Here are the 49ers preseason opponents and schedule.

Regular season

Schedule
The game will kickoff at 6:15 p.m. MST/5:15 p.m. PST, and will be televised on ESPN, with the Cardinals serving as the home team.

The remainder of the 49ers' 2022 schedule was announced on May 12.

Game summaries

Week 1: at Chicago Bears

Week 2: vs. Seattle Seahawks

Week 3: at Denver Broncos

Week 4: vs. Los Angeles Rams

Week 5: at Carolina Panthers

Week 6: at Atlanta Falcons

Week 7: vs. Kansas City Chiefs

Week 8: at Los Angeles Rams

Week 10: vs. Los Angeles Chargers

Week 11: at Arizona Cardinals
NFL Mexico City games

Week 12: vs. New Orleans Saints

Week 13: vs. Miami Dolphins

Week 14: vs. Tampa Bay Buccaneers

Week 15: at Seattle Seahawks

This win over the divisional rival Seahawks officially clinched the NFC West for the 49ers.

Week 16: vs. Washington Commanders
{{Americanfootballbox
|titlestyle=;text-align:center;
|state=autocollapse
|title=Week 16: Washington Commanders at San Francisco 49ers – Game summary
|date=
|time=1:05 p.m. PST
|road=Commanders
|R1=0|R2=7|R3=7|R4=6
|home=49ers
|H1=0|H2=7|H3=14|H4=16
|stadium=Levi's Stadium, Santa Clara, California
|attendance=71,642
|weather=Hazy, 
|referee=Jerome Boger
|TV=CBS
|TVAnnouncers=Kevin Harlan, Trent Green, and Melanie Collins
|reference=Recap, Game Book
|scoring=
First quarter
 No scoring plays.
Second quarter
SF – Ray-Ray McCloud 71-yard run (Robbie Gould kick), 6:26. 49ers 7–0. Drive: 7 plays, 99 yards, 3:06.
WAS – Jahan Dotson 7-yard pass from Taylor Heinicke (Joey Slye kick), 0:22. Tied 7–7. Drive: 8 plays, 31 yards, 2:35.
Third quarter
SF – George Kittle 34-yard pass from Brock Purdy (Robbie Gould kick), 10:38. 49ers 14–7. Drive: 7 plays, 76 yards, 4:42.
SF – George Kittle 33-yard pass from Brock Purdy (Robbie Gould kick), 4:52. 49ers 21–7. Drive: 2 plays, 34 yards, 0:51.
WAS – Terry McLaurin 3-yard pass from Taylor Heinicke (Joey Slye kick), 2:46. 49ers 21–14. Drive: 4 plays, 75 yards, 2:06.
Fourth quarterSF – Robbie Gould 26-yard field goal, 14:56. 49ers 24–14. Drive: 5 plays, 52 yards, 2:50.
SF – Robbie Gould 23-yard field goal, 12:02. 49ers 27–14. Drive: 4 plays, 6 yards, 2:02.
SF – Robbie Gould 35-yard field goal, 9:17. 49ers 30–14. Drive: 4 plays, 8 yards, 1:54.
WAS – Curtis Samuel 20-yard pass from Carson Wentz (pass failed), 5:25. 49ers 30–20. Drive: 11 plays, 82 yards, 3:51.
SF – Christian McCaffrey 1-yard run (Robbie Gould kick), 2:13. 49ers 37–20. Drive: 8 plays, 33 yards, 3:12.
|stats=Top passersWAS – Taylor Heinicke – 13/18, 166 yards, 2 TD, INT
SF – Brock Purdy – 15/22, 234 yards, 2 TD, INTTop rushersWAS – Brian Robinson Jr. – 22 rushes, 58 yards
SF – Ray-Ray McCloud – 1 rush, 71 yards, TDTop receivers'''
WAS – Terry McLaurin – 4 receptions, 77 yards, TD
SF – George Kittle – 6 receptions, 120 yards, 2 TD
}}

Week 17: at Las Vegas Raiders

Week 18: vs. Arizona Cardinals

Standings
Division

Conference

Postseason

Schedule

Game summaries
NFC Wild Card Playoffs: vs. (7) Seattle Seahawks

NFC Divisional Playoffs: vs. (5) Dallas Cowboys

NFC Championship: at (1) Philadelphia Eagles

Statistics

Team

IndividualStatistics correct as of the end of the 2022 NFL season''

References

External links
 

San Francisco
San Francisco 49ers seasons
San Francisco 49ers
NFC West championship seasons